Abū Shujāʿ Ruzzīk ibn Ṭalāʾiʿ was the son of the Twelver Shi'a Armenian vizier of the Fatimid Caliphate, Tala'i ibn Ruzzik, and succeeded his father when the latter was assassinated in September 1161. He was himself overthrown by the Bedouin military commander Shawar in early 1163 and executed in August 1163.

References

Sources 
 
 
 
 

1163 deaths
12th-century Armenian people
12th-century people from the Fatimid Caliphate
Egyptian people of Armenian descent
Ethnic Armenian Shia Muslims
Muslims of the Crusades
Viziers of the Fatimid Caliphate
Year of birth unknown